is a railway station in the city of Murakami, Niigata, Japan, operated by East Japan Railway Company (JR East).

Lines
Fuya Station is served by the Uetsu Main Line, and is 95.9 kilometers from the starting point of the line at Niitsu Station.

Station layout
The station consists of one ground-level side platforms and one island platform connected by a footbridge. However, only one side of the island platform is in normal use. The station is unmanned, but there is an automatic ticket vending machine.

Platforms

History
Fuya Station opened on 31 July 1924. With the privatization of Japanese National Railways (JNR) on 1 April 1987, the station came under the control of JR East.

Passenger statistics
In fiscal 2017, the station was used by an average of 95 passengers daily (boarding passengers only).

Surrounding area
 former Yamakita Town Hall

See also
 List of railway stations in Japan

References

External links

 JR East station information 

Stations of East Japan Railway Company
Railway stations in Niigata Prefecture
Uetsu Main Line
Railway stations in Japan opened in 1924
Murakami, Niigata